Eugenia pitanga, commonly known as  or savanna pitanga, is a species of plant in the family Myrtaceae. It is found in the savannahs and grasslands of Argentina, Paraguay, and Brazil. It is a deciduous shrub that grows up to 2 metres tall, has rhizomatous rootstock allowing it to form dense thickets, and produces red, edible fruit, 15-25mm in diameter.

References

pitanga
Crops originating from the Americas
Crops originating from Brazil
Tropical fruit
Endemic flora of Brazil
Fruits originating in South America
Fruit trees
Berries
Plants described in 1893